Abdelmajid Eddine (born April 17, 1979) is a Moroccan footballer who currently plays for Ittihad Khemisset in the top division in Morocco Botola.

Biography 
Eddine came to prominence when he scored 13 goals for Olomby during the 2007–08 season. This earned him a move to Nasr in summer of 2008. He was one of the Benghazi club's star performers, with 9 goals.

He spent a brief spell at FUS Rabat before returning to Ahly Tripoli for the 2009–10 season. He already has 4 goals at the turn of the year.

Eddine return to prominence When he became the top scorer in the Botola during the 2010–11 season. This earned him a move to Al Arabi in winter of 2011.

In January 2012, Al Arabi sacked all the foreign players after the loss from Kazma SC in Kuwait Emir Cup.

References 

1979 births
Living people
Footballers from Casablanca
Moroccan footballers
Moroccan expatriate footballers
Dhofar Club players
Fath Union Sport players
Raja CA players
Expatriate footballers in Libya
Expatriate footballers in Oman
Expatriate footballers in Kuwait
Moroccan expatriate sportspeople in Libya
Moroccan expatriate sportspeople in Oman
Moroccan expatriate sportspeople in Kuwait
Olympique Club de Khouribga players
JS Kairouan players
COD Meknès players
Ittihad Khemisset players
Association football forwards
Olympic Azzaweya SC players
Libyan Premier League players